Jamal Rayyan (born 23 August 1953 in Tulkarm) is a Palestinian news television anchorman with Al Jazeera Television Network.

Professional experience

Jordan Radio and Television News
From 1974 to 1989 Jammal Rayan worked as news reporter and presenter for Jordan Radio and Television Corporation, Amman (Jordan).

Korean Broadcasting System
From 1974 to 1979 then 1979–1985 he worked as news reporter and Middle Eastern political analyst for Korean Broadcasting System, Seoul (South Korea). He also worked as a news reporter for the Arabic radio station that belongs to KBS Network.

BBC News
From 1994 to 1996 he worked as anchor for the BBC Arabic World Service, London (England).

Abu Dhabi
From 1989 to 1994 then 1997–1999 he worked as news anchor and political program moderator for Abu Dhabi Al Oula Television Network, Abu Dhabi (UAE). He is noted for the programs "The World of News Tonight" and "The Fourth Dimension".

Al Jazeera
From 1996 to 1997 he worked as a program moderator and anchorman with the newly-established Al Jazeera network in Doha, Qatar. He assisted in the channel's creation and in training and mentoring news presenters.

Rayyan participated in news coverage of Iraq, the War on terrorism, the Palestinian-Israeli conflict. He conducted interviews with presidents, prime ministers, and political key players.

Since 1999, he has returned to working at Al Jazeera.

See also
 List of news presenters

References

Living people
Al Jazeera people
1953 births
Palestinian journalists
Palestinian broadcasters
People from Tulkarm